Henrich Jaborník (born February 18, 1991) is a Slovak professional ice hockey defenceman. He is currently a free agent having last played for HK Dukla Trenčín in the Slovak Extraliga.

Jaborník previously played for HK 36 Skalica, HC '05 Banská Bystrica, ŠHK 37 Piešťany and HK Poprad and up to 2016, he played a total of 279 games in the Slovak top tier. During the 2013–14 season, he played in the MOL Liga for Dunaújvárosi Acélbikák before returning to Slovakia. 

On June 6, 2016, Jaborník went back to Hungary and signed for Ferencvárosi TC. After two seasons, he returned to Dunaújvárosi Acélbikák on July 11, 2018. On May 29, 2019, he moved to JKH GKS Jastrzębie of the Polska Hokej Liga before returning to Slovakia on August 4, 2020, signing for HK Dukla Trenčín.

Career statistics

Regular season and playoffs

International

References

External links

 

1991 births
Living people
HC '05 Banská Bystrica players
HK Dukla Trenčín players
Dunaújvárosi Acélbikák players
Ferencvárosi TC (ice hockey) players
JKH GKS Jastrzębie players
Sportspeople from Skalica
ŠHK 37 Piešťany players
HK Poprad players
HK 36 Skalica players
Slovak ice hockey defencemen
Slovak expatriate ice hockey people
Expatriate ice hockey players in Hungary
Expatriate ice hockey players in Poland
Expatriate ice hockey players in Austria
Slovak expatriate sportspeople in Austria
Slovak expatriate sportspeople in Poland
Slovak expatriate sportspeople in Hungary